Tidal, king of Goyim, possibly a Hittite king, was a monarch mentioned in Genesis 14:1. Genesis describes Tidal as one of the four kings who fought Abraham in the Battle of Siddim. 

The word goyim in biblical Hebrew can be translated as "nations" or "peoples" or "ethnic groups" (in modern Hebrew it means "Gentiles"), although biblical scholars suggest that in this verse it may instead be a reference to the region of Gutium.

Theories about the name
 The name Tidal is considered equivalent to Tudhaliya, the name both of a Proto-Hittite king and a Hittite king.  The name continued as "Tudal" down to the Neo-Hittite period.

See also
 Amraphel
 Arioch
 Chedorlaomer
 Melchizedek
 Tudiya

References

Torah monarchs
Lech-Lecha